John Goodrich Gager Jr. (born 1937 in Boston, Massachusetts) is an American scholar of Christianity. He retired from his position as William H. Danforth Professor of Religion at Princeton University in the spring of 2006.

Biography 
The Gager family's roots in New England reach back to the arrival of John Winthrop and the "Winthrop Fleet" at what became the Massachusetts Bay Colony in 1630.

Gager joined the faculty of Princeton University in 1968 as an assistant professor in the Department of Religion, having previously taught at Haverford College.  After studying at Phillips Exeter Academy in New Hampshire, Gager went on to receive his B.A. and M. Div. from Yale University and his Ph.D. from Harvard University. Gager undertook additional studies at the Sorbonne in Paris and at the University of Tübingen in Germany.  During his studies in Yale, Gager was a Freedom Rider, and was arrested in Jackson, Mississippi in June 1961.

Gager's scholarly concern is with the religions of the Roman Empire, especially early Christianity and its relations to ancient Judaism, and has also written on the theme of religion and magic. Professor Gager is also an avid rock climber, kayaker, and cyclist.

In his book "Kingdom and Community: The Social World of Early Christianity" (1975), Gager helped pioneer an interdisciplinary approach to the study of religion, drawing particularly on the works of sociologists Peter L. Berger and Thomas Luckmann.

In "Reinventing Paul" (2002), Gager argued for a radical new understanding of the apostle Paul's views of Jews and Judaism. From Library Journal on "Reinventing Paul:"

Gager's work on curse tablets or defixiones in his book Curse Tablets and Binding Spells from the Ancient World is some of the best in this field.

Major books
 Reinventing Paul (2002), 208 p., 
 The Origins of Anti-Semitism : Attitudes toward Judaism in Pagan and Christian Antiquity (1985), 312 p., 
 Moses in Greco-roman Paganism (1972), 176 p., 
 Curse Tablets and Binding Spells from the Ancient World. (1992), 278 p.,

References

External links
 Robert Orlando, "Reinventing Paul" - Columbia Professor of Religious Studies reviews Gager's "Reinventing Paul."
 Brent Vine's review of "Curse Tablets" Bryn Mawr Classical Review (2003).
 Gager bio - Princeton's bio of John Gager, slightly outdated.
 Jonathan Zebrowski, "Religion professor, active mentor, to retire".
 Daily Princetonian Editorial, "Two great professors leave a legacy".

1937 births
Living people
Harvard University alumni
University of Paris alumni
American religion academics
Phillips Exeter Academy alumni
Princeton University faculty
American expatriates in France
American expatriates in Germany
Historians of Christianity
Writers from Boston